is a Japanese football player for Oita Trinita.

Career
After a season with Nara Club in Japan Football League, Shige moved to Giravanz Kitakyushu and debuted in pro-football as March 2017, when he played his first game with Gira against Cerezo Osaka U-23.

Club statistics
Updated to 2 December 2022.

Honours
 Giravanz Kitakyushu, Blaublitz Akita
 J3 League (2): 2019, 2020

Individual
JFL  Best XI: 2016
JFL Rookie of the Year: 2016

References

External links

Profile at Nara
Profile at Giravanz Kitakyushu
Profile at Akita

1993 births
Living people
Ritsumeikan University alumni
Association football people from Nagasaki Prefecture
Japanese footballers
J3 League players
Japan Football League players
Nara Club players
Giravanz Kitakyushu players
Blaublitz Akita players
Association football midfielders